Kim Do-hyun (Korean: 김도현; born 9 April 1994) is a South Korean footballer who plays as a midfielder for Estonian team Narva Trans.

Career

Kim attended Kyushu University in Japan, where he played college football. Unable to join a professional team in Japan, Kim returned to South Korea and played for the K3 League team Goyang Citizen. He then moved to Europe and played for lower league sides in Serbia and Croatia.

In February 2020, Kim signed for Domžale in the Slovenian top flight.

References

External links

1994 births
Living people
South Korean footballers
South Korean expatriate footballers
Association football midfielders
FK Bežanija players
NK Krka players
NK Domžale players
NK Aluminij players
NK Triglav Kranj players
JK Narva Trans players
K3 League players
Second Football League (Croatia) players
Slovenian Second League players
Slovenian PrvaLiga players
Meistriliiga players
Expatriate footballers in Serbia
South Korean expatriate sportspeople in Serbia
Expatriate footballers in Croatia
South Korean expatriate sportspeople in Croatia
Expatriate footballers in Slovenia
Expatriate footballers in Estonia
South Korean expatriate sportspeople in Estonia